Dark Streets may refer to:
 Dark Streets (2008 film), a film adaptation of the play by Glenn M. Stewart
 Dark Streets (1929 film), a lost American pre-Code crime film
 Dark Streets (RPG), a horror role-playing game